Gianpaolo Mondini (born 15 July 1972 in Faenza) is an Italian former road bicycle racer. He won the 18th stage in the 1999 Tour de France and the 2003 Italian National Time Trial Championship.

Doping
In 2002 Mondini was sacked from US Postal after police found EPO and growth hormones in his hotel room during 2001 Giro d'Italia. He admitted using illegal substances.

Major results

1996
 1st Stage 7 Tour de Pologne
 2nd Overall Hofbrau Cup
1997
 1st  Overall Tour of Sweden
1st Stage 1
 1st Stage 5 Circuit de Lorraine
 10th Giro dell'Emilia
1998
 1st GP Industria Artigianato e Commercio Carnaghese
 3rd Giro d'Oro
1999
 1st Stage 18 Tour de France
 1st Stage 1 Tour de Pologne
 1st Stage 5 Tour of Japan
 8th LuK Challenge
2000
 1st Omloop van de Vlaamse Scheldeboorden
 8th E3 Prijs Vlaanderen
2003
 1st  Time trial, National Road Championships
 9th Firenze–Pistoia

Grand Tour general classification results timeline

See also
 List of doping cases in cycling

References

External links

Results at Tour de France for Gianpaolo Mondini

1972 births
Living people
People from Faenza
Italian male cyclists
Italian Tour de France stage winners
Doping cases in cycling
Cyclists from Emilia-Romagna
Sportspeople from the Province of Ravenna